ITI Township Mankapur, also known as Sanchar Vihar Colony, is a township and a Nagar Panchayat (Notified Area Council) in Gonda district in the Indian state of Uttar Pradesh. It is a residential colony under the Mankapur Unit of ITI Limited. It is a constituency of Uttar Pradesh Legislative Assembly. It was established in the year 1983 for manufacturing Nation’s first Electronic Switching System (E-10B) in collaboration with M/S CIT-Alcatel. To cater to the New Technology demand, Mankapur started manufacturing OCB/CSN Exchanges from 1993-94 and supplied 3000 KL to BSNL/ MTNL. The plant started manufacturing Base Trans-receiver Station (BTS rack) for GSM equipment in technical collaboration with M/S ALCATEL from July 2005. In the process of diversification, the plant produces Bank Mechanization Products like Note Counting and Fake Note Detecting machines. To further diversification efforts, the plant has built up a new infrastructure for manufacturing of LED Based Products like LED Solar lantern & LED street lights for rural applications and LED tube lights & decorative indoor lights for Grid Based urban applications.

A lean and highly productive plant by virtue of its structure has the modern facilities for assembly & automatic testing with SMT Line, environmental test labs, PCB manufacturing and sophisticated Powder Coating Line.

Projects of national importance like Network For Spectrum (NFS) and National Population Register (NPR-40) are being executed by ITI Mankapur plant.

The Unit is proud of winning Prime Minister’s National Shram Award (viz, 11 Shram Devi & 01 Shram Shree). The Unit is ISO 9001-2008 certified and also accredited with ISO 14001: 2004 Certification for Environment Management System.

Climate 

The climate of Mankapur is a subtropical humid climate. The rainiest month is in July and the coldest month is in January.

Education

The township hosts three schools:
 Kendriya Vidayala is situated in the premises of ITI Limited, Mankapur. The school works for the physical, mental, educational, emotional, ethical and spiritual development in the best possible way. The school plays a vital role in the making of healthy, honest and responsible citizens. The founding stone was laid down on 24 November 1987 by Shri Dharmavir Gupta, the then Caretaker Managing Director.
 St. Michael’s Convent School. One of the elite christian diocese schools of the area.
 DAV ITI Mankapur. Dayanand Adarsh Vidyalaya

Nearby places
 Gonda (30 km) 
 Faizabad (50 km) 
 Gorakhpur (156 km)
 Lucknow (179 km)
 Varanasi (235 km)

Transportation
Mankapur is well connected by train and road. The nearest railway station is Manakpur Junction (4 km). The nearest airport is Lucknow Airport (162 km).

Major railway stations such as Gorakhpur, Lucknow and Varanasi are connected with Mankapur Junction.

Tourism
Major tourist places near Mankapur
 Ayodhaya (35 km), Train Links 
 Varanasi (235 km),
 Shravasti (90 km)
  Sunauli, Nepal Border

References

External links 
 

Gonda district
Townships in India
Neighbourhoods in Uttar Pradesh